Heracleides of Smyrna was physician, mentioned by Diogenes Laërtius as one of the followers of Hicesius, the head of the Erasistratean school of medicine at Smyrna, who must therefore probably have lived in the first century BC.

Notes

1st-century BC Greek physicians
Ancient Smyrnaeans